The Roman Catholic Diocese of Karwar is a diocese located in the city of Karwar in the Ecclesiastical province of Bangalore in India.

Bishops
 Bishop [see vacant] (Since May 2019)
 Bishop Rt. Rev. DR. Derek Fernandes (2007-2019)
 Bishop William Leonard D'Mello (24 January 1976 –  24 February 2007)

References

External links
 GCatholic.org 
 Catholic Hierarchy 

1976 establishments in Karnataka
Christian organizations established in 1976
Christianity in Karnataka
Roman Catholic dioceses and prelatures established in the 20th century
Roman Catholic dioceses in India
Uttara Kannada district